Rumiñahui (in Hispanicized spelling) or Rumiñawi (Quechua rumi stone, ñawi eye, "stone eye") is a canton of Pichincha Province in Ecuador. Its seat is Sangolquí. The canton lies southeast of Quito Canton and forms a suburb of Quito.

Rumiñahui was named a Pueblo Mágico by the Ecuadorian Ministry of Tourism (MINTUR) in 2020. It was the first canton in Pichincha to be awarded that distinction.

Parishes
The canton is made up of the following parishes:
Urban parishes: Sangolquí, Taboada
Rural parishes: Cotogchoa, Rumipamba

See also 
 Rumiñawi (Inca warrior)
 Rumiñawi (volcano)

Sources 

 
Cantons of Pichincha Province